McGilbert House is a historic house in Lufkin, Texas.  It was listed on the National Register of Historic Places in 1988.

It is a one-story frame house with lap siding and a shed porch supported by wood posts.  It was observed to be a rare surviving example of early company housing in Texas, and was deemed a "good example of worker housing associated with the Angelina County Lumber Mill and the company town of Keltys."

See also

National Register of Historic Places listings in Angelina County, Texas

References

Houses on the National Register of Historic Places in Texas
Houses completed in 1885
Houses in Angelina County, Texas
Demolished buildings and structures in Texas
Lufkin, Texas
National Register of Historic Places in Angelina County, Texas